Sir Graham Allan Hart  (born 13 March 1940) is a British retired civil servant.

Hart was born in Romford, the son of Frederick Hart and Winifred Schofield. He was educated at Brentwood School and Pembroke College, Oxford.

Hart made his career in the Department of Health, rising to be permanent secretary there from 1992 to 1997.

Upon retirement he served as chair of the King's Fund and of Citizens Advice, and sat on the advisory committee of the Centre for History in Public Health. He also undertook a PhD in early modern history.

He was made a Companion of the Order of the Bath (CB) in the 1987 New Year Honours and a Knight Commander of the Order of the Bath (KCB) in the 1996 Birthday Honours.

References

External links 

 

1940 births
Living people
People from Romford
People educated at Brentwood School, Essex
Alumni of Pembroke College, Oxford
Knights Commander of the Order of the Bath
British civil servants
Permanent Under-Secretaries of State for Health